The Archdiocese of Santa Fe is a Latin Church ecclesiastical territory or diocese of the southwestern region of the United States in the state of New Mexico.  While the mother church, the Cathedral Basilica of St. Francis of Assisi, is in the city of Santa Fe, its administrative center is in the city of Albuquerque.  The Diocese comprises the counties of Rio Arriba, Taos, Colfax, Union, Mora, Harding, Los Alamos, Sandoval, Santa Fe, San Miguel, Quay, Bernalillo, Valencia, Socorro, Torrance, Guadalupe, De Baca, Roosevelt, and Curry.  The current archbishop is John Charles Wester, who was installed on June 4, 2015.

The Archdiocese announced it would file for bankruptcy protection on November 29, 2018, in the face of dozens of ongoing lawsuits stemming from a sexual abuse scandal that stretches back decades and a new investigation by the state's attorney general into the Catholic Church's handling of misconduct by its clergy. Bankruptcy was then filed in June 2019, followed by a bankruptcy plan in October 2022.

History

Origins of Catholicism in New Mexico 
The History of Catholicism in the Santa Fe area began in the mid 16th century, with the arrival of the Spanish to the area. While conquistadors had already passed through what is now known as New Mexico in search of gold and silver as early as 1527, the first permanent settlement did not arrive in the area until 1598. In that year, Juan de Oñate arrived from New Spain with 500 Spanish settlers and nearly 7,000 head of livestock that. With him came ten Franciscan priests, that established the first Spanish missions in New Mexico. One in particular, the San Miguel Mission, is considered one of the oldest church structures originally built in the continental United States. The original adobe walls and altar were built by the Tlaxcalan Indians from Mexico in 1610, but much of the structure was rebuilt in 1710 (See List of the oldest churches in the United States).

In 1608, the Franciscans converted over 7,000 natives to Catholicism. While the natives attended mass and behaved like Catholics, the native Pueblo people continued practice their local customs and beliefs, much to the chagrin of the missionaries. Despite attempts to outlaw the use of entheogenic drugs, and the seizure of masks, prayer sticks, and effigies used in religious ceremonies, the attempts to fully convert the natives was never fully successful. While the missionaries' early attempts to convert the Pueblo Indians can be seen as a failure, the proselytizing aspect of Spanish colonization, and the power of the mission, persisted. This eventually led to tension between the civil administration and the clergy. A Spanish Governor, Bernardo López de Mendizábal, attempted to protect native rights by enforcing labor rights and allowing natives to practice native religious ceremonies. The missionaries responded by having the governor arrested and turned over to the Mexican Inquisition, where he was found guilty of heresy. This ensured the power of the Missionaries, who imposed their strict rules upon the native population.

This strict theocratic rule imposed on the Pueblo natives culminated in what is now known as the Pueblo Revolt. In response to the arrest of 47 Pueblo medicine men, and the execution of four, a Pueblo Indian named "Popé" led an uprising to expel the Spanish from the area in 1680. 400 Spanish settlers were killed, including 21 of the 33 Franciscan missionaries. The rest, including many Indian slaves, retreated south to El Paso del Norte. Following the revolt, the natives destroyed all elements of Catholicism in the area, and cleansed themselves in a ritual bath. Their independence was short lived, and the Spanish returned in 1692. After the Franciscan priests returned, the natives were able to practice their traditional rituals, ceremonies, and religion.

In the words of the Archdiocese of Santa Fe, the period following the reconquest of New Mexico until Mexican Independence was a time of reconciliation and growth. While there were still abuses and reprisals on both sides, the centuries that followed  produced a "truly unique" form of Catholicism that reflects the cultural and historical circumstances of the area.

Mexican–American War, Zubiría and the Santa Fe ring  

In 1833, José Antonio Laureano de Zubiría y Escalante was appointed archbishop of Durango. A large part of Zubiría's mission as bishop was to enhance the connection between Catholicism and Mexican nationalism. Zubiria planned to enforce this connection by reasserting the institutional hierarchy of the church. While he did carry notable success, the annexation of New Mexico to the United States following the Mexican–American War (1846–1848) complicated his plans. Large parts of territory that once fell under his jurisdiction suddenly became a United States territory, complicating the notion the national, racial, and religious identity.

There was an effort to introduce Euro-American clergy to the region, as a way to displace Mexican priests and "Americanize" the Catholic Church there, which created tension between the Mexican Americans and Euro-Americans. At the time, a large amount of Euro-Americans viewed Catholicism as a "superstitious" church and felt that Mexicans were racially inferior for believing in this. There was a disconnect between the Euro-Americans and the Mexican Americans living in New Mexico and other parts of the Southwest that caused many issues for the Mexican Americans that identified with Catholicism. The Euro-Americans that had replaced the Mexican priests felt that assimilation to American culture was vital, and they used racist ideas to justify the changes that they were making to the Catholic Church. However, Zubiria still had jurisdiction over Doña Ana, La Mesilla, and Las Cruces which kept the newly appointed bishop of Santa Fe Jean Lamy and his clergymen out of Southern New Mexico until 1868. José Jesus Baca, a priest originally appointed by Zubiria, asked transfer to the archdiocese of Durango after following the change. In response, Zubiria appointed him to supervise all of the major parishes in southern New Mexico (Mora). Baca felt most comfortable in one of the parishes, named Mesilla, where he decided to take a political position as a part of the Church, continuing Zubiria's mission of resistance.

Baca became politically active in the area, lending his support to the Republican Party. He supported the Republican candidates because he felt that it aligned with his Catholic faith, and that Mexicans who supported Democrats were "betraying" their religion. Despite his support for Republicans, in 1871, Baca and José Manuel Gallegos, who was a Democrat, shared an intense opposition to French control over New Mexico's parishes. Gallegos went on to lose an election because his alignment with Catholicism seemed to suggest to his opponents that his loyalty was to Mexico rather than to the United States. After this, Baca viewed Gallegos as a threat to Mexican Catholics due to his political stance. Baca encouraged "loyal Catholics" to vote for Gallegos' opponent, believing that this would allow Baca and the other Mexican American priests to continue to hold jurisdiction over the southern New Mexico parishes.

Unfortunately for Baca, the Republican win did not ensure that he and the other Mexican priests would maintain control over these parishes. The election of 1872 set the stage for the Santa Fe Ring. The Santa Fe Ring was a group of influential and powerful elites in New Mexico who manipulated the communal land grant system in order to accumulate land. Although Baca hadYur predicted that the Mexicans would lose control over the parishes in southern New Mexico with the election of a Democrat, the loss of land occurred anyway due to the immense amount of power that the Santa Fe Ring held.

The Mexican Americans who held control over the southern New Mexico parishes gradually began to lose power to the Euro-Americans. This time period proved to be a time of intense conflict between the Mexican Americans and the Euro-Americans. The Mexican Americans living in this area dealt with extreme difficulties as a result of their faith. The attempts by the Euro-Americans to assimilate the Mexican Americans created discord between the two and led to the continued silencing of Mexican American populations in the United States.

Establishment of the Archdiocese with Jean Lamy 
Following the Mexican–American War, the Treaty of Guadalupe Hidalgo gave the United States authority over a large territory that was previously under Mexican control, including New Mexico. The area that now encompasses the archdiocese of Santa Fe was originally part of the archdiocese of Durango in Mexico, under the authority of bishop José Antonio Laureano de Zubiría. Following this annexation, the territory fell under the jurisdiction of the Catholic Church in the United States.

In 1851, Pope Pius IX created the Apostolic Vicariate of New Mexico, and appointed Jean-Baptiste Lamy as its first Bishop. Before his appointment in Santa Fe, Lamy had been assigned to Danville, Ohio in 1839 after accompanying John Baptist Purcell to the United States from southern France. Jean Lamy played a crucial role in the establishment of the Archdiocese Santa Fe. Named its bishop, Jean Lamy had traveled and eventually arrived in Santa Fe in the summer of 1851.

Once there, Lamy was informed that the clergy did not yet recognize him as bishop because the previous bishop, Zubiría, had not yet confirmed the change. Lamy took it upon himself to visit Zubiría in Durango to confirm this switch. Even after this visit, the conflict between Lamy and Zubiría continued. Zubiría remained the bishop of Durango, although the territory was much smaller after the Treaty of Guadalupe. The main conflict between Zubiría and Lamy was over who would administer southern New Mexico. Once Lamy returned to Santa Fe in 1852, it became apparent that his woes had just begun. With Lamy as bishop, a lot of controversy throughout Santa Fe arose. Many of the initial actions Lamy had taken as bishop did not sit well with the parishioners of New Mexico and his decisions had contradicted many of the bishops before him. For instance, Lamy outlawed the Penitente Brotherhood and excommunicated 5 priests who were cohabiting with women outside of marriage. Furthermore, Lamy had a known dislike of New Mexican culture, and this became evident with his treatment of Mexican clergymen. Lamy expressed his dislike first through his appointment of clergymen. Not only were they non-native, but he had chosen to appoint both French priests and Europeans which did not sit well with the Mexican Catholics living in New Mexico. He continued to express this dislike through a dismissal of dissident priests, and his orders to build a cathedral that followed western architecture as opposed to the more common Mexican style of churches. This attitude of "Americanizing" the Catholic Church in New Mexico created tension between the mostly Mexican clergy and the now western administration. A Mexican priest from the parish of Taos, Antonio José Martínez, compiled a list of complaints against Lamy, cosigned by many of the other clergymen. One particular complaint centered on Lamy's suspension of the priest José Manuel Gallegos, which sparked controversy among both the clergy and the parishioners, who submitted a further petition in support of Gallegos. Gallegos then went on to run for office in New Mexico as a Democrat.

More controversy arose when Lamy had appointed Damaso Taladrid to replace Martínez as priest in Taos. Taladrid was not well-liked among the clergy, and many questioned Lamy's decision to appoint a non-native as priest. In the 1927 novel Death Comes for the Archbishop, Willa Cather writes about a character representative of Lamy's role. His portrayal of the original priests in New Mexico negatively reflects New Mexican culture, and describes Lamy's actions to appoint French and European men as an act of suppressing Mexican influence in the church. Lamy's tenure as archbishop of Santa Fe had started off with a series of delays and controversies, and only worsened with his decision to outlaw the Penitente Brotherhood, which eventually became known as his largest initial reform.

Initial reforms 
The neglect of Mexican Americans by the Catholic Church paved the way for the Penitente Brotherhood in New Mexico. The Penitente Brotherhood is a catholic lay confraternity that is still active today. The Penitentes believe in three core principles; charity, prayer, and being the good example. In addition to providing for the community's religious needs, mutual aid and community charity were at the forefront of their beliefs. The Penitentes came to popularity in New Mexico in the 1820s following Mexican independence.  Following independence, the Catholic Church withdrew its clergymen and priests from the area, creating a religious void for the people of New Mexico, which the Penitente Brotherhood filled.  The Penitentes have long been a source of tension within the Catholic church, well before their establishment in New Mexico. A lot of this tension comes from the practice of flagellation, which has historically been a very important idea in folk Catholicism. Flagellation can be defined as flogging or beating, either as a religious discipline, or for sexual gratification. (google definitions) Flagellation can also be done to oneself by oneself, which further complicates the discussion. The Penitente Brotherhood were known for acts of violence against themselves, especially wearing only white cotton trousers with a scarf to hide the lower part of their face, dragging heavy crosses, and whipping themselves.  Many of these acts of flagellation occur on each Friday of Lent, throughout Holy Week, and Fridays between the Holy Week and Pentecost. Furthermore, as the end of Lent nears, these acts of Penitence become more open to the public, primarily at their meeting houses, called Moradas.

Well before their establishment in New Mexico, the brotherhood and their belief of flagellation received criticism by religious leaders and governments. Pope Clement VI issued a bull against flagellation in the 1300s, and the German bishops forbade the assembly of German flagellants in this time period as well. In Spain, the royal cedula of 1777 forbade certain types of Penitente behavior, especially flagellation. This reform would be brought by Spain to Mexico and would come into effect in New Mexico as well.  Even Mexican Priests wanted to keep the Brotherhood private. In February 1833 the Parish Priest Antonio José Martínez, with the tacit approval of the Bishop Zubiria, forbade the public acts of Penitence, but still allowed for the practice to be carried out at night and in private. He understood the power the Penitente had, and allowed the group to exist as long as the practice of flagellation were kept private. Priest Martinez would then go on to receive notoriety in 1847, when he led a revolt that included the killing of governor Charles Bent, the first American governor of the newly acquired territories in New Mexico.

Following the annexation of the territory by the United States, the isolated Mexican clergy and devout Catholics further turned to the Penitente. In 1851, Pope Pius IX created the Apostolic Vicariate of New Mexico, and appointed Jean Lamy as its first Bishop. Joseph Lamy, a Frenchman, would strongly disapprove of the brotherhood and further act to outlaw it. The Penitente Brotherhood disobeyed their bishop and transformed into a more secretive society, where it is today. 
Another area where the Catholic Church and specifically Lamy worked on ending is Concubinage, defined as "a relationship between persons who are cohabiting without the benefit of marriage."  This activity is disavowed by the Catholic Church.  One way that Lamy looked to end these types of relationships was by ex-communicating 5 Spanish speaking clergy men for concubinage.  For example, one clergymen that Lamy expelled was Jose Manuel Gallegos.  Some would even argue that ending concubinage was one reason the Jean Lamy was sent to New Mexico.  For example, one missionary who argued for Lamy to be sent to the United States is quoted as saying in regards to New Mexico, it "still pitifully calls itself a Catholic country, …. The few priests are without guidance or discipline. They are lax in religious observance, and some of them live in open concubinage."

Sex abuse claims and bankruptcy
The Archdiocese announced it would file for bankruptcy protection on November 29, 2018, in the wake of dozens of ongoing lawsuits stemming from a sexual abuse scandal that stretches back decades. A new investigation was also ordered by the state's attorney general into the Catholic Church's handling of misconduct by its clergy. On June 21, 2019, the Archdiocese of Santa Fe officially filed for Chapter 11 bankruptcy after it was announced that there were 395 individuals suing the Archdiocese for past sex abuse. 

Prior to filing for bankruptcy, the Archdiocese transferred assets worth over $150 million into trusts and its incorporated parishes. In October 2020, a bankruptcy judge ruled that abuse survivors could file lawsuits alleging these transfers were a fraudulent attempt to avoid bigger payouts to victims. It has also been alleged that such a strategy fits into a larger pattern of similar asset-shielding from abuse-related bankruptcy filings nationwide by the Catholic Church.

Bishops

Vicar Apostolic of New Mexico
 Jean-Baptiste Lamy (1850–1853), title changed to Bishop of Santa Fe with erection of diocese

Bishop of Santa Fe
 Jean Baptiste Lamy (1853–1855) elevated to Archbishop

Archbishops of Santa Fe
 Jean-Baptiste Lamy (1855–1885)
 Jean-Baptiste Salpointe (1885–1894; Coadjutor Archbishop 1884–1884)
 Placide Louis Chapelle (1894–1897; Coadjutor Archbishop 1891–1894), appointed Archbishop of New Orleans and later Apostolic Delegate to Cuba and Puerto Rico and Extraordinary Envoy to the Philippines
 Peter Bourgade (1899–1908)
 John Baptist Pitaval (1909–1918)
 Albert Daeger, OFM (1919–1932)
 Rudolph Gerken (1933–1943)
 Edwin Byrne (1943–1963)
 James Peter Davis (1964–1974)
 Robert Fortune Sanchez (1974–1993)
 Michael Jarboe Sheehan (1993–2015)
 John Charles Wester (2015–present)

Auxiliary Bishops
 John Baptist Pitaval (1902–1909), appointed Archbishop of this archdiocese
 Sidney Matthew Metzger (1939–1941), appointed Bishop of El Paso

Other priests of this diocese who became Bishops
 Arthur Tafoya, appointed Bishop of Pueblo in 1980
(Jeffrey Neil Steenson, former Episcopal bishop and later priest of this archdiocese, was appointed Ordinary of the Chair of St. Peter in 2012 but could not become a Catholic bishop)

Churches

Cathedral
Bishop Jean-Baptiste Lamy started construction on the Cathedral Basilica of Saint Francis of Assisi (commonly known as the St. Francis Cathedral) in 1869. It would be the third church to occupy the portion of land. The first was a chapel constructed by Franciscan Friars in 1610 which 
was destroyed in the Pueblo Revolt of 1680; the second was an adobe parish church built in 1717 which St. Francis Cathedral replaced. Construction was not finished until 1884, by which time, the diocese had become the archdiocese, and the cathedral – dedicated to Saint Francis of Assisi – became its mother church. Archbishop Lamy is entombed in the sanctuary floor of the cathedral, and a bronze statue, dedicated in 1925, stands in his memory outside the front entrance of the cathedral.

It was built in a Romanesque style found in Bishop Lamy's native France. The interior reflects the pastel colors of New Mexico; The pews are made of blonde wood, and the walls and columns are painted a dusky pink with pale-green trimmings. Stone for the building was mined from what is now Lamy, New Mexico - named in the Archbishop's honor – and the stained glass was imported from France. The cathedral was originally intended to have two spires rising up from its landmark bell towers, but due to costs, this was delayed, and finally canceled, giving the bell towers a very distinctive look.

Conquistadora Chapel

The adjoining Conquistadora Chapel is all that remains of the second Church. Built in 1714, this tiny Chapel houses La Conquistadora, the oldest Madonna in the United States, brought by Franciscan Friars in 1626.

Elevation to a basilica

On June 15, 2005, Archbishop Sheehan announced that Pope Benedict XVI had designated the cathedral a basilica. The cathedral was officially elevated on October 4, 2005. Its full name, the Cathedral of Saint Francis of Assisi, was consequently changed to the Cathedral Basilica of Saint Francis of Assisi. Elevation of Cathedral Basilica of St. Francis - Archdiocese of Santa Fe

Loretto Chapel
The archdiocese is also the home of the Loretto Chapel, which contains an ascending spiral staircase—the building of which the Sisters of Loretto consider to be a miracle due to the unusual construction of the staircase (see Loretto Chapel for a more detailed discussion).

Education
 High schools
 St. Michael's High School, Santa Fe
 St. Pius X High School, Albuquerque

Suffragan sees

Gallup
Las Cruces
Phoenix
Tucson

See also

 Anton Docher
 Catholic Church by country
 Catholic Church in the United States
 Ecclesiastical Province of Santa Fe
 Catholic Church by country
 Jean-Baptiste Lamy 
 List of Catholic archdioceses (by country and continent)
 List of Catholic dioceses (alphabetical) (including archdioceses)
 List of Catholic dioceses (structured view) (including archdioceses)
 List of Catholic cathedrals in the United States
 List of Catholic dioceses in the United States
 Loretto Chapel

References

External links

Roman Catholic Archdiocese of Santa Fe Official Site

 
Archdiocese of Santa Fe
Religious organizations established in 1850
Santa Fe
1850 establishments in New Mexico Territory
Santa Fe
Companies that filed for Chapter 11 bankruptcy in 2019
Companies that filed for Chapter 11 bankruptcy in 2022